The 2021–22 Wessex Football League season (known as the Sydenhams Football League (Wessex) for sponsorship reasons) was the 36th in the history of the Wessex Football League since its establishment in 1986. The league consists of two divisions: the Premier Division and Division One.

The constitution was announced on 18 May 2021.

After the abandonment of the previous two seasons due to the COVID-19 pandemic, a number of promotions were decided on a points per game basis over the 2019–20 and 2020–21 seasons.

Premier Division
The Premier Division was increased from 20 clubs to 21, after Lymington Town were promoted to the Southern League, and Fleet Town and Tadley Calleva were transferred to the Combined Counties League.

Four new teams joined the division:
Three promoted from Division One:
Alton
Hythe & Dibden
United Services Portsmouth
One resigned from Southern League Division One South:
Moneyfields

League table

Division One
Division One was increased from 19 clubs to 20 after Alton, Hythe & Dibden and US Portsmouth were promoted to the Premier Division.

Four new teams joined the division:
Two transferred from the Combined Counties League Division One:
Ash United
Fleet Spurs
Two promoted from the Hampshire Premier League:
Infinity
Millbrook, changing their name from Bush Hill F.C. prior to this season

Infinity withdrew from the league on 6 February 2022 after their groundshare agreement with Hythe & Dibden was terminated by Hythe. This followed an incident in which an Infinity player was sent off during a match for using racist language. Subsequent attempts to find another ground at which Infinity could play were unsuccessful. Infinity's playing record was later expunged from the league table.

League table

Promotion playoffs

References

External links
 Wessex Football League official site

Wessex Football League seasons
9